The Battle of María (15 June 1809) saw a small Spanish army led by Joaquín Blake y Joyes face an Imperial French corps under Louis Gabriel Suchet.

Background
The Spanish campaign in early 1809 started with the Battle of Uclés.

Battle
After an inconclusive contest earlier in the day, Suchet's cavalry made a decisive charge that resulted in a French victory. Though the Spanish right wing was crushed, the rest of Blake's army got away in fairly good order after abandoning most of its artillery. The action occurred during the Peninsular War which was part of the larger struggle known as the Napoleonic Wars.

Aftermath
The Spanish campaign in early 1809 proceeded with the French advance in Catalonia in the Battle of Belchite.

Notes

References

Further reading

External links
 

Battles of the Peninsular War
Battles involving Spain
Battles involving France
Battle of María
Battle of María
June 1809 events
Battles inscribed on the Arc de Triomphe